Martin Luberda (born 18 December 1991) is a Slovak football defender who currently plays for MŠK Tesla Stropkov.

Club career

1. FC Tatran Prešov
Luberda made his professional Fortuna Liga debut for Tatran Prešov against Ružomberok on 16 July 2016.

References

External links
 1. FC Tatran Prešov official club profile
 Fortuna Liga profile
 
 Eurofotbal profile
 Futbalnet profile

1991 births
Living people
Slovak footballers
Association football defenders
1. FC Tatran Prešov players
FK Poprad players
FK Humenné players
MŠK Tesla Stropkov players
Slovak Super Liga players